Robert Reiser (born June 27, 1963) is a former crew chief and a general manager for RFK Racing. Reiser is the son of Alice and John Reiser, who served as general manager for Roush Racing's Busch and Craftsman Truck series race shops.

Career

Reiser started racing on the short tracks of Wisconsin. In 1984, he began driving late models. He won 14 different track, area and regional championships from 1990–1992. From 1993 to 1997 his racing career culminated as a driver/owner in the NASCAR Busch Series.

Crew chief
In 1997, Reiser decided to stop his racing career in the Busch Grand National Series, he put snowmobile racer Tim Bender in his car. Bender got hurt after the eighth race at Texas, so he put his former Wisconsin competitor Matt Kenseth in the drivers seat until Bender recovered. Reiser lost the 1994 late model track championship at Madison International Speedway to Kenseth. Kenseth was quickly successful. Then Reiser and Kenseth combined for a second-place finish in 1998 and a third-place finish in 1999. In 2000, Jack Roush hired Kenseth, Reiser, and their entire Busch team to run full-time in Winston Cup. The combination was again successful. They rapidly moved up the final points each year. In 2003 Kenseth and Reiser dominated to win the final Winston Cup championship as driver/crew chief. With Reiser from 2000 to 2007, Kenseth won 16 races. In 2008, Reiser served as interim crew chief for Carl Edwards, helping Edwards win at Texas Motor Speedway.

General manager
Near the end of the 2007 season, Reiser was named the general manager for all five of Roush Fenway Racing's Nextel/Sprint Cup teams. His last race as crew chief was the Ford 400 at Homestead-Miami Speedway in Florida, which became the second victory of the season for driver Matt Kenseth.

Reiser was relieved of his duties as RFR GM on November 22, 2016.

Motorsports career results

NASCAR
(key) (Bold – Pole position awarded by qualifying time. Italics – Pole position earned by points standings or practice time. * – Most laps led.)

Busch Grand National Series

Craftsman Truck Series

References

External links

1963 births
American Speed Association drivers
Living people
NASCAR crew chiefs
NASCAR drivers
NASCAR team owners
People from Addison, Wisconsin
Racing drivers from Wisconsin